Sondershausen is a town in Thuringia, central Germany, capital of the Kyffhäuserkreis district, situated about 50 km north of Erfurt. On 1 December 2007, the former municipality Schernberg was incorporated by Sondershausen.

Until 1918 it was part of the principality of Schwarzburg-Sondershausen.

Geography
Sondershausen is situated in North Thuringia and lies in low mountain range between Hainleite (in the north) and Windleite (in the south). The highest mountain is the Frauenberg to the west of the town. A little river called Wipper flows through Sondershausen. Around the town there are mixed forests (especially with beech trees).

Subdivisions
The city districts are:

Culture and main sights

Museums
In the Sondershausen Palace there is a large museum with three different exhibit areas. Special exhibits are the Golden Coach, the only of its kind in Germany, and the legendary Püstrich.
There are possible special guided tours of demonstrationdepot, cellar, tower and park of the castle, too.

Under the city there is a mine to visit.

To visit is a Jewish bath from the 14th Century since 1999 under the gallery on the Schlossberg.

Buildings
 Sondershausen Palace, with natural history and antiquarian collections. Adapted as Palace in Renaissance times, it was later expanded in Baroque forms (1764–1771). Especially noteworthy are the "Blue Hall" and the gardens.
 The Old Princes' Palace (1721–1725), a residence of the princes from 1835 to 1851. It currently houses the district administration office of the Kyffhäuserkreis.
 The Octagonal House
 "Alte Wache"
 "Geschwister-Scholl-Gymnasium Sondershausen" building I. (a grammar school)
 mikveh
 theatre "Haus der Kunst" (translated: "house of art")
 Rathaus (city hall)
 Gottschalcksches Haus (House of Gottschalck)

Churches
 The Baroque Trinitatiskirche, a Lutheran church, with the mausoleum (1892) of the reigning princes.
 Crucis Church, the oldest building of Sondershausen.
 St. Matthias Church, the historicist construction is considered one of the most beautiful churches in the region
 St. Petri Church in Jechaburg
 St. Georg Church in Bebra
 St. Viti Church in Berka
 St. Bonifatius Church  in Großfurra
 St. Johannis Church in Oberspier
 Church of Großberndten
 Church St. Mauritii in Himmelsberg
 Church Gloria Deo in Hohenebra
 Church of  Immenrode
 Church St. Johannes in Kleinberndten
 St. Crucis Church in Schernberg
 Church of Thalebra
 St. Elisabeth Church (catholic)

Notable people
 Rudolf Arzinger (1922–1970), public international law
 Felix Becker (1864–1928), art historian
 Regina Miriam Bloch (1888–1938), writer and poet
 Johann Günther Friedrich Cannabich (1777–1859), geographer
 Edmund Döring (1860–1938), Heimatforscher
 Ernst Christoph Dressler (1734–1779), composer, operatic tenor, violinist and music theorist
 Ernst Ludwig Gerber (1746–1819), composer, music writer, musician
 Jörg Hoffmann (born 1963), Rennrodler, Olympiasieger von 1988 in Calgary
 Thilo Irmisch (1816–1878), botanist
 Günther Jahn (born 1933), Painter
 Michael Kohl (1929–1981), Jurist, stellv. Außenminister der DDR
 Olaf Koch (born 1932), Rector of the High School for Music in Berlin
 Karl Krieghoff (1905–1984), local poet
 Vera Lengsfeld (born 1952), politician
 Georg Lewin (1820–1896), Dermatology, Faculty (university)
 Georg Richard Lewin
 Kurt Lindner (1906–1987), Science of Hunting
 Valentin Ernst Löscher (1674–1749), theologian, writer
 Günther Lutze (1840–1930), botanist, Heimatforscher, chronicler
 Joachim Manard (Manhard, Manardt) (1564–1637), chronicler of the town
 Ludwig Günther Martini (1647–1719), jurist
 Curt Mücke (1885–1940), Painter
 Carl Moeller (1867–1920), pastor and Heimatforscher
 Hermann Müller (1891–1984), Heimatforscher
 Gunda Niemann-Stirnemann (born 1966), Speed skating
 Ronald Paris (1933–2021), Painter
 Werner Schubert (1921–1991), Painter
 Heinz Scharr (born 1924), Visual arts
 Ferdinand Schlufter (1871–1948), Major
 Volker Strübing (born 1971), book author, cabaret artist and songwriter
 Johann Friedrich Suckow (1769–1842), musician
 Johann Karl Wezel (1747–1819), poet

Sister cities
Sondershausen is twinned with three cities: 
 Rolla, Missouri, United States
 Pecquencourt, France
 Kazlų Rūda, Lithuania

References

External links

Kyffhäuserkreis
Schwarzburg-Sondershausen